Tar Khanan Na Mohra is a town in the Islamabad Capital Territory of Pakistan. It is located at 73° 17' 5E 566 with an altitude of 566 metres (1860 feet).

References 

Union councils of Islamabad Capital Territory